WD J1953−1019 is a hierarchical triple system of white dwarfs located at about 130 parsecs (about 420 light years) from the Earth. This is the first triple system of white dwarfs to be resolved. The three white dwarfs have an atmosphere of pure hydrogen and a mass of about 0.6 times that of the Sun.

The system consists of a central pair, WD J1953−1019 BC, and a distant companion, WD J1953−1019 A. WD J1953−1019 B and C correspond to the sources Gaia DR2 4190499986125543168 and 4190499986125543296 respectively.

The cooling age found by M. Perpinyà-Vallès and collaborators for the three white dwarfs is consistent, with an estimated value between 40 and 290 million years. The three stars would each come from a star that had a mass between 1.6 and 2.6 times that of the Sun. A collision of the central pair due to Lidov-Kozai oscillations is unlikely as the system is dynamically stable. However, if this collision occurred, it could produce a type Ia supernova below the Chandrasekhar mass.

See also 
SDSS J0106−1000 – a short-period binary white dwarf system, in the constellation Cetus
WD J0651+2844 – another short-period binary white dwarf system, in the constellation Gemini

Notes

References 

Triple star systems
White dwarfs
Aquila (constellation)